Dato' Pkharuddin Ghazali (born  1963) is a Malaysian civil servant and educator who served as the 19th Director-General of Education since 23 September 2022.

Education 
He obtained a Bachelor of Science with Honours in Geography field from University of Malaya.

Career 
Pkharuddin has served in various organizations of the ministry during his 33 years of service, including as Assistant Director of the Assessment and Examination Sector at the Examination Board and Principal at Sekolah Menengah Kebangsaan Taman Semarak, Nilai, Negeri Sembilan and also as Deputy Director General of Education.

On 23 September 2022, Ministry of Education announced that he was appointed as Director General of Education for replacing Nor Zamani Abdol Hamid who retired on 29 July 2022.

References 

1963 births
Living people
Malaysian educators
Malaysian civil servants